Battlezone is a first-person shooter tank combat game released for arcades in November 1980 by Atari, Inc. The player controls a tank which is attacked by other tanks and missiles, using a small radar scanner to locate enemies around them in the barren landscape. Its innovative use of 3D graphics made it a huge hit, with approximately 15,000 cabinets sold.

With its use of three-dimensional vector graphics, the game is considered to be the first true 3D arcade game with a first-person perspective, the "first big 3D success" in the video game industry, and the first successful first-person shooter video game in particular, making it a milestone for first-person shooter games.

The game was primarily designed by Ed Rotberg, who was mainly inspired by Atari's top-down shooter game Tank (1974). Battlezone was distributed in Japan by Sega and Taito in 1981. The system was based on vector hardware designed by Howard Delman which was introduced in Lunar Lander and saw success with Asteroids. The 3D hardware that drove the program saw use in following games, including Red Baron, released in 1981.

History
With the success of the Cinematronics vector graphics games, Atari's Grass Valley engineering labs decided to build their own version of a vector display system known as "QuadraScan" that offered a resolution of 1024 x 768. Once it was up and running, they delivered the prototype unit to Atari headquarters where it was given to Howard Delman and Rick Moncrief to develop it into a unit suitable for arcade game use. Delman decided to reimplement the driver system using analog electronics instead of digital, simplifying it and lowering its cost.

While working on the system, Delman suggested they use it to implement a version of Lunar Lander. While Delman worked on the driver hardware and Moncrief on the display system, Rich Moore wrote the software for the game. Lunar Lander was released in August 1979, Atari's first vector game, but was not a great success with only 4,830 units manufactured.

Another team at Atari consisting of Lyle Rains, Ed Logg, and Steve Callfee was working on a raster graphics game called Planet Grab. When they saw Lunar Lander they asked about using the same system for their game, and the result was Asteroids. Released in November 1979, it went on to be Atari's most successful game, with 55,000 units sold.

With the system now proving a huge success in the arcades, Morgan Hoff organized a brainstorming session at Atari to consider additional uses for the hardware. Around the same time, Atari had also been experimenting with early 3D displays using a custom math chip known simply as "the math box", developed by Jed Margolin and Mike Albaugh. The idea of using the math box with the vector hardware seemed like a winner, and the idea of a tank game was raised at the meeting, although Hoff could not remember exactly who introduced the idea.

The game's design was led by Ed Rotberg. He cited Atari's top-down arcade shooter game Tank (1974) as the primary inspiration behind Battlezone, essentially a 3D version of that game. While Battlezone also has similarities to a first-person tank simulation for the PLATO system, Panther, Rotberg said he had never played that game before but had heard of it; he said it "may have inspired whoever originally suggested the idea at the brainstorming meeting where it was proposed, but I seriously doubt it."

Owen Rubin, who shared an office with Ed Rotberg, came up with the idea of making the volcano in the background erupt, and coded the animation for it.

Gameplay

The game uses wireframe vector graphics displayed on a black and white vector monitor. A colored overlay tints the display green for the bottom  where the action takes place, and red for the top  where the score and radar screen are displayed.

The player drives a tank using two joysticks, one controlling the right tread and the other the left. By moving the joysticks relative to each other, the tank can move forward or reverse (both moved in the same direction), turn on the spot to the left or right (one forward, one back) or move and turn at a slower rate (one forward or backward, one neutral). The right-side stick also has a fire button on top, which fires the player's gun in the direction the tank is currently facing.

Gameplay takes place on a flat plane with a mountainous horizon featuring an erupting volcano, distant crescent moon, and various geometric solids (in vector outline) like pyramids and blocks. The geometric solid obstacles are indestructible and can block the movement of a player's tank, but also block shots and can be used as shields. The action surrounds the player in all directions, including off-screen locations, forcing the player to locate the enemy using the radar display at the top of the screen. 

There are three types enemy craft that appear during play, one at a time. At the start of a game, the enemy is dominated by slow tanks that are not particularly difficult to hit even when moving. As the game continues, missiles begin to appear in place of the enemy tanks; these move much faster and are more difficult to hit. Finally, the much faster supertanks appear at higher levels, which are not only harder to hit but also attack more aggressively.

Periodically saucer-shaped UFOs will appear while making a distinctive sound to announce their presence; these do not appear on the radar and do not attack the user, but can be shot for bonus points. This is the only object that may appear while other enemies are already present.

There is a gameplay modification at 100,000 points if the proper conditions are met. When executed properly, the next appearing supertank will not attack but will instead retreat. A tank icon will then appear at right on qualified high score listings.

Cabinet

Battlezone is housed in an upright full-sized arcade cabinet with a "periscope" viewfinder. The viewfinder limited the player's view so that the display appeared to be naturally limited to that of the scope. The game action can also be viewed from the sides of the viewfinder for spectators to watch. The game's periscope viewfinder is similar to earlier submarine shooting arcade games, notably Midway's arcade video game Sea Wolf (1976) and Sega's electro-mechanical game Periscope (1966). A later version of the cabinet removed the periscope and raised the monitor to a more normal position to improve visibility to non-players and improve ergonomics for players who could not reach the periscope. A smaller, "cabaret" version of the cabinet has the screen angled upwards and no periscope.

The large controller handles were adapted from earlier gear-shift controllers used on racing games, modified with a new stick shape with internal ribs to make them stronger and adding rubber centering bellows. The right stick has a raised and LED illuminated fire button on top, and the controls were completed with a similar LED illuminated start button on the cabinet. There were two speakers, one each above and below the 19-inch monitor.

Reception
Battlezone was released in November 1980 and was a hit. Although not as successful as Asteroids, Battlezone eventually produced another 15,000 sales for Atari.

Battlezone was well received, earning an Honorable Mention for "Best Commercial Arcade Game" in 1982 at the Third Annual Arkie Awards. It was runner-up, behind Pac-Man. David and Sandy Small called it "addictive" and mention the "Battlezone Tunnel Vision, which makes you drive strangely during rush hour." In a more recent review, Eurogamer stated "Atari's designers came up with some incredibly inventive and interesting games before their decline. Battlezone is one of the finer examples" and rate it 8 out of 10. Fox gives it a 4 out of 5 rating in The Video Games Guide, although he admits this might perturb some readers. In 1996, GamesMaster ranked the arcade version 97th on their "Top 100 Games of All Time"

Ports
In the 1980s, Battlezone was ported to the Apple II, Atari 2600, Commodore 64, VIC-20, IBM PC, ZX Spectrum, and later the Atari 8-bit and ST computers. The ports to non-Atari systems were from Atarisoft. The ZX Spectrum version was published by Quicksilva.

The Atari 8-bit version was released on cartridge in 1987 in the styling of the then-new Atari XEGS. An Atari 5200 port was scheduled for release in November 1983, but was cancelled.

The Atari 2600 version uses raster graphics instead of vectors and has a third person view where the tank is visible.

The Atari ST port contains large parts of the original 6502 code which is emulated.

The Bradley Trainer

A version called The Bradley Trainer (also known as Army Battlezone or Military Battlezone) was designed for use by the U.S. Army as targeting training for gunners on the Bradley Fighting Vehicle. It was commissioned by a consultant group of retired generals.

Approaching Atari in December 1980, some developers within Atari refused to work on the project because of its association with the Army, most notably original Battlezone programmer Ed Rotberg. Rotberg only joined the project after he was promised by management that he would never be asked to do anything with the military in the future. According to Rotberg, it took him three months of constant work to develop the prototype version of The Bradley Trainer. Only two were produced; one was delivered to the Army and is presumed lost, and the other is in the private collection of Scott Evans, who found it by a dumpster in the rear parking lot at Midway Games.

The gunner yoke was based on the Bradley Fighting Vehicle control and was later re-used in the popular Star Wars game. The Bradley Trainer differs dramatically from the original Battlezone as it features helicopters, missiles, and machine guns; furthermore, the actual tank does not move but the guns simply rotate.

Legacy
Because of its use of first-person pseudo 3D graphics combined with a "viewing goggle" that the player puts his or her face into, Battlezone is sometimes considered the first virtual reality arcade video game.

Related games and rereleases
 In 1993, the replicated version of Battlezone was included in Microsoft Arcade for PC with Windows 3.1 and Windows 95, and Mac version for Apple Macintosh.
 Battlezone 2000 for the Atari Lynx was released in 1995.
 It was included in the 1996 Battlezone / Super Breakout combo for the Game Boy.
 Activision developed an authorized Battlezone game in 1998. Despite having the same name, it is not an arcade game, but a more complicated tank piloting strategy game. Battlezone II: Combat Commander is the 1999 sequel.
 A re-imagining of Battlezone was developed by Paradigm Entertainment and released for the PlayStation Portable.
 In 2008, an updated version of Battlezone was released on Xbox Live Arcade by Atari
 In 2013, Rebellion Developments bought the Battlezone franchise from the Atari bankruptcy proceedings. In 2016, a virtual reality game titled Battlezone was released for the PlayStation 4. It was ported to Microsoft Windows in 2017. It supports Oculus Rift, HTC Vive and PlayStation VR.

Clones and inspired games
 Stellar 7 (1983) for the Apple II and Commodore 64
 Robot Tank (1983) by Activision for the Atari 2600 is similar to the official port of Battlezone.
 Encounter (1983) for the Atari 8-bit computers and Commodore 64 is also similar to 2600 Battlezone, with scaled sprites instead of wireframe 3D graphics. It includes the missiles and saucers of the original.
 3D Tank Zone (1983) for the Acorn Electron and BBC Micro by Dynabyte
 3D Tank Duel (1983) and Rommel's Revenge (1984) for the ZX Spectrum
 Rommel 3D (1985) for the TRS-80 Color Computer
 bzone for Domain/OS, later rewritten for the X Window System and Macintosh 
 Spectre (1991) for the Macintosh
 BZ for the Silicon Graphics workstations added network play.
 Stramash Zone (2018) was self-published for the Vectrex.

See also

 Golden age of video arcade games

References

Citations

Bibliography

External links
 
 Battlezone at the Arcade History database
 
 
 Battlezone software disassembly and analysis

1980 video games
Apple II games
Arcade video games
Atari 2600 games
Atari 8-bit family games
Atari arcade games
Atari Lynx games
Atari ST games
Cancelled Atari 5200 games
Commodore 64 games
First-person shooters
Hand Made Software games
Quicksilva games
Sega arcade games
Single-player video games
Taito arcade games
Tank simulation video games
Vector arcade video games
VIC-20 games
Video games developed in the United States
Virtual reality games
ZX Spectrum games